Robert Packer (12 September 1614 – 25 February 1682) of Shellingford, Berkshire was an English politician who sat in the House of Commons  in two periods between 1646 and 1679, as well as being Usher of the Exchequer.

Packer was the eldest son of the Clerk of the Privy Seal, John Packer of Shellingford Manor in Berkshire (now Oxfordshire)  and his wife, Philippa, the daughter of Francis Mills of Bitterne in Hampshire. He was educated at University College, Oxford and succeeded his father in 1649.

In 1646, he was elected Member of Parliament for Wallingford in the Long Parliament. He was excluded in 1648 under Pride's Purge. In 1660, Packer was elected  again as MP for Wallingford in the Convention Parliament. He was re-elected in 1661 for the Cavalier Parliament and sat until 1679.
 
Packer married Temperance Stephens daughter of Col. Edward Stephens of Little Sodbury in Gloucestershire, by whom he had at least four children. He inherited Shellingford from his father in 1649 and died on 25 February 1682, at the age of  67, being buried in Shellingford Church.

References

1614 births
1682 deaths
Alumni of University College, Oxford
People from Vale of White Horse (district)
People from Wallingford, Oxfordshire
English MPs 1640–1648
English MPs 1661–1679